Heteropurpura is an extinct genus of predatory sea snail, a marine gastropod mollusk in the family Muricidae, the rock snails or murex snails.

Fossil records
The fossil record of this species dates back to the Pliocene (age range: 3.6 to 2.588  million years ago). These fossils have been found in Italy and Spain.

Description

Species
 †Heteropurpura polymorpha  Brocchi 1814

References

Monotypic gastropod genera
Extinct gastropods
Ocenebrinae